Blacc Balled is the debut album by rapper Lil' C-Style released January 27, 2004.

Track listing
 "Let These Niggas Know" (Intro) 1:05
 "Blacc Balled " 4:18
 "What U Gone Be When U Grow Up?" 3:58
 "Bouce You Ridahz" (featuring Quictamac and Daz Dillinger) 3:45
 "G' Style" 3:19
 "Gramblin' Wit Big Style" (Skit) 
 "Who Got Some Gangsta Shit, Pt. 2" (featuring Daz Dillinger) 4:21
 "Who U Thought I Waz"  (featuring Small Will) 3:47
 "Word on the Street" (Skit) (featuring Spoonie Loc and Lil' Hecc Locc)
 "Heard It Waz a Rumor" 3:58
 "No Justice, No Peace" 4:04
 "A Dedicated Rap" 4:38
 "Hollerin' at a Lil' Stank" (Skit) (featuring Spoonie Loc)
 "I Just Want to Fucc!" (featuring Speshyo) 3:45
 "Lil' Style Shout Outs!" 3:09

References

2004 debut albums
Albums produced by Daz Dillinger
Albums produced by Fredwreck
Albums produced by Soopafly
West Coast hip hop albums